Jesse Thayer (1845–1910) was an American educator and legislator.

Born in Janesville, Wisconsin, he served in the American Civil War. Afterwards, he graduated from Milton College. He was a superintendent of public schools and was a mathematics professor at Rivers Falls Normal School (now University of Wisconsin–River Falls). In 1885–1886, he served in the Wisconsin State Assembly. He also served as the Superintendent of Public Instruction of Wisconsin 1887–1891.

Notes

1845 births
1910 deaths
Politicians from Janesville, Wisconsin
People of Wisconsin in the American Civil War
Educators from Wisconsin
Superintendents of Public Instruction of Wisconsin
Members of the Wisconsin State Assembly
University of Wisconsin–River Falls faculty
19th-century American politicians